The 2014 Pocono IndyCar 500 was the twenty-first running of the event, and was an IndyCar Series race held on July 6, 2014, at the Pocono Raceway in Long Pond, Pennsylvania. The race was the eleventh in the 2014 IndyCar Series season. Juan Pablo Montoya won the pole and later went on to win the race, which was the fastest 500 mile automobile race of any kind in history.

Summary

Juan Pablo Montoya secured the pole position with a 2-lap average speed of 223.871mph. There were 16 lead changes among 5 drivers. There was only one caution period for 6 laps when Graham Rahal spun and made wall contact in turn 1 on lap 158. Montoya went on to win the race from the pole, leading 45 laps and defeating Helio Castroneves by 2.34 seconds. The race was completed in only 2 hours, 28 minutes, for an average speed of 202.402 mph, the fastest 500-mile race of any kind in motorsport history.

References

Pocono IndyCar 500
Pocono IndyCar 500
Pocono IndyCar 500
Motorsport in Pennsylvania
Pocono Mountains